KGL could refer to:

 King's German Legion, a unit of the British Army during the Napoleonic Wars
 Kvaerner Govan Ltd, a former shipyard company in Glasgow, Scotland
 Kunggari, a dialect of the Bidjara language, an extinct Australian Aboriginal language; ISO 639-3 language code kgl
 Kogalymavia airline, Russia; ICAO airline code KGL
 Kigali International Airport, Rwanda; IATA airport code KGL
 Kings Langley railway station, England; National Rail station code KGL